The American Philatelic Research Library (APRL), based in Bellefonte, Pennsylvania, is the largest public philatelic library in the United States.

The library serves the needs of the members of the American Philatelic Society (APS) – with which it is closely affiliated and shares premises – and the public. It has  more than 21,000 book titles and 5,700 journal titles. Its current  building opened in 2016.

Legal status 
The library is a public library under Pennsylvania law and is registered with the United States Internal Revenue Service as a 501(c)(3) non-profit corporation. Donations are treated as a charitable deduction for the purposes of United States federal income tax.

Governance 
The library is run by a nine-member Board of Trustees. Each member serves for six years. Three members are elected by the American Philatelic Society membership, three are appointed by the President of the APS and three are elected by the founders and patrons of the APRL.

Magazine
The library publishes a quarterly magazine, the Philatelic Literature Review, which includes book reviews and other relevant content.

See also
List of philatelic libraries
 International Philatelic Libraries Association
Philatelic literature

References

Further reading 
"The APRL is hobby's greatest treasure trove" by Kathleen Wunderly
Philatelic Literature Review, Journal of the American Philatelic Research Library

External links 
Official website
Library catalog

Library buildings completed in 2016
Philatelic libraries